The K.A. Auty Cup Trophy is an international cricket series played between Canada and the United States. It is reputed to be the first and longest-running international sporting fixture of any type. It has been an annual series hosted alternately by Cricket Canada and USA Cricket. The series saw a 17-year hiatus beginning in 1994 due to financial difficulties. Since its revival in 2011, the series has been expanded from a two-day match only to a two-day match, a 50-over match, and two Twenty20 matches.

History

The first Auty Cup Trophy match was a two-day match held from the 25–27 September 1844 at St George's Cricket Club in Manhattan, New York. Largely as a result of this match, the first Canadian Prime Minister, John A. Macdonald, declared cricket Canada's first official sport in 1867.

The trophy was donated by Karl André Auty of Chicago, Illinois. The original trophy was retired in 1963 to honour the memory of K. A. Auty and re-dedicated 20 years later in Calgary, on 19 November 1983, by Canadian Cricket Association president Jack Kyle and United States of America Cricket Association president Naseeruddin Khan. The re-dedicated Auty Cup trophy resides at the Toronto Cricket, Skating and Curling Club.

The 2016 Auty Cup was won by Canada (retaining the Cup), in a series of three 50 over matches held on October 13, 14, and 16, in Los Angeles just before the 2016 ICC World Cricket League Division Four tournament. In 2017 Auty Cup was won by USA, in a series of three 50 over matches played on Sept. 12–14 in Toronto. There was no competition in 2018, as the two organizations were not able to finalize terms for the Cup Series. After a gap of four years, the series was scheduled to resume in July 2021, but was delayed due to the COVID-19 pandemic.

References

Cricket in Canada
Cricket in the United States
Cricket rivalries
International cricket competitions
Sports rivalries in Canada
Sports rivalries in the United States
International cricket competitions in the United States
International cricket competitions in Canada